In 1911 the British War Office announced their first Military Aeroplane Competition for aircraft to meet the requirements of the Air Battalion Royal Engineers. The formal requirements were published in December 1911. By the time the trials were held in August 1912, the Air Battalion had become the Military wing of the Royal Flying Corps (RFC). It was held at Larkhill on Salisbury Plain, and the competition was won by S. F. Cody with his Cody V biplane.

"Specification for a Military Aeroplane"

By 1911 it was clear that the development of aircraft had reached the point where they were of military significance.  France, the world leader in aviation at the time, had over 200 aircraft in military service. In contrast, Britain's total military aircraft strength was nineteen aircraft, of which, in the words of Colonel J.E.B Seely, Under-Secretary of State for War,  "one is broken beyond repair and one is quite out of date. Others are more or less under repair" adding "We are arriving at a point when we think we see our way to choose what is the best type, first for teaching people to fly, and secondly, to buy for the purposes of war should war unfortunately break out". The only practical step that had been taken by the War Office was the creation of an establishment for the scientific examination of the various problems involved in aircraft design.  After some consultation with the Royal Aero Club and various aircraft manufacturers, they announced their "Specification for a Military Aeroplane" in late December, the details being published in Flight magazine on 23 December 1911.

The aircraft's performance had to meet the following requirements:
Provide accommodation for a pilot and observer, with controls capable of use by either occupant.
Attain an air speed of not less than 55 miles per hour.
Take off from long grass or rough ground in 100 yards (91 m) or less in calm weather, and be capable of being landed without damage on cultivated land by a pilot of ordinary skill.

Additionally, the aircraft had to be transported to Larkhill in a crate of specified size and assembled there. Aircraft had to be capable of being dismantled and transported by road or rail, and the ease of rigging and de-rigging would be one of the factors taken into account by the judges.

Prizes were to be awarded for aircraft built in any country: first prize £4,000, second prize £2,000. Prizes for British subjects in an aircraft made in the United Kingdom (except the engine): first prize £1500, two second prizes of £1,000, and three third prizes of £500. Ten other aircraft that passed the flying test would be given £100.

The War Office issued an amended and slightly less demanding list of specifications in May 1912, and manufacturers were to submit their entries to the Secretary of the Judges Committee by 15 June. The aircraft had to be delivered to Larkhill on or before 15 July. No date was given for the actual flying trials.

These eventually started on 2 August 1912. Originally 32 different aircraft were entered for the trials but some failed to turn up. The competition was judged by a committee consisting of Brigadier D . Henderson, Captain Godfrey Paine and Mervyn O'Gorman, with Major F.H. Sykes acting as Secretary.

The trials were very different from modern military aircraft trials. Although the public were excluded from the aircraft hangars and flying field, otherwise free access was allowed. Aviation was then a subject of great popular interest, and many people came to watch.

Aircraft

Aftermath
The Cody biplane successfully passed all the tests and was declared winner of the competition, despite the fact that several other of the competitors (such as the Hanriot monoplanes) demonstrated better all-round performance. As a result, the Cody was purchased by the Flying Corps, with an order placed for a second example to be built by Cody.

Several more of the competitors were also purchased by the Royal Flying Corps. These were the Blériot XI-2, the two Bristol Coanda monoplanes and the two Gnome-powered Deperdussins. Most of these aircraft saw little use, with one of the Deperdussins crashing fatally on 6 September 1912, followed by one of the Bristol-Coanda monoplanes on 10 September (with the Bristol crash being caused by inadvertent operation in flight of a quick-release catch which had been fitted to allow easy disassembly for the Trials). These crashes resulted in a ban being imposed on monoplane use by the RFC, which had a long-term effect on the course of British aircraft design.  The Cody Trials aircraft crashed fatally due to a structural failure in April 1913, and the second Cody biplane was withdrawn from use.

The War Office had already placed orders for A. V. Roe's Type 500 two seat biplane, the Gnome-engined immediate predecessor of the Type G. They had also placed orders for examples of the B.E.1 built by the Royal Aircraft Factory and designed by Geoffrey de Havilland. The prototypes of this design had put in a number of appearances at the trials and had clearly demonstrated its all-round superiority over the other aircraft; they were barred from competition because the Director of the Royal Aircraft Factory, Mervyn O'Gorman, was on the panel of judges.

References

Bibliography

Bruce, J. M. The Aeroplanes of the Royal Flying Corps (Military Wing). London: Putnam, 1982. .
Driver, Hugh The Birth of Military Aviation: Britain 1902-1914. Woodbridge: The Boydell Press for the Royal Historical Society, 1997. 
Lewis, P British Aircraft 1806-1914. London: Putnam, 1967

External links
 
 

Aviation history of the United Kingdom
Aviation competitions and awards
1912 in aviation
1912 in military history
Military Aeroplane Competition
20th-century military history of the United Kingdom
Military history of Wiltshire
August 1912 events